Jaber Fandy "Jay" Gubrium is an American sociologist. He has been a professor in the University of Missouri Department of Sociology since 2002.

Career 
He chaired the Missouri Department of Sociology from 2002 to 2016. He now is emeritus professor in that department. Before that, he was a professor of sociology at University of Florida (1987-2002) and Marquette University (1970-1987). He currently is a visiting professor in the College of Nursing at the University of Massachusetts Amherst. 

He was a Fulbright Scholar at Tampere University in Finland (1996), Alfreda Kartha Distinguished Lecturer at the University of Toronto, Queen's University, and the University of Ottawa (1996), a Leiv Eririksson Fellow at Oslo Metropolitan University in Norway (2012-13), and was granted a doctorate honoris causa by Lund University in Sweden (2017).  He is founder of the Journal of Aging Studies.

Research 
Gubrium's areas of research are aging, health, care, everyday life, family discourse, human services ethnography, identity construction, social interaction, qualitative methods, and narrative analysis. He developed a constructionist approach to the life course. He and collaborator James Holstein formulated an analytic vocabulary for studying identity as an institutional formation and family as a category of experience. The approach is methodically elaborated in relation to the complex practices of power in social interaction.

Gubrium contributed to the development of qualitative methods by conceptualizing their theoretical bearings. He has examined the everyday practices of narrativity, locating stories, storytelling, and social forms within the circumstances of their production. The aim is to locate and describe social forms (identity, family, aging, health, policy, service and care) within the practice of everyday life. 

Gubrium is concerned with the practices of meaning-making in diverse circumstances, from ordinary encounters to going concerns such as residential treatment for problem children and aging in nursing homes. He works at the border of ethnography and narrative analysis, combining these to deal with the perennial problems of linking observational data with stories, speech and other narrative material.

He executed a program of research on the social organization of care and treatment in human service institutions. His research on the everyday practice of caregiving in nursing homes, originally described in his monograph "Living and Dying at Murray Manor," presents the details of care from the perspectives of the residents, the staff and family members. He paid special attention to caregiving and the cognitively impaired, in particular how the Alzheimer's disease movement transformed the meaning of senility, as reported in his book Oldtimers and Alzheimer's: The Descriptive Organization of Senility. The program extended to institutional practices across the life course. 

Ethnographies of institutional settings set the basis for comparison. Earlier research on interpretive practices in a residential treatment center for emotionally disturbed children was followed by ethnographic and narrative studies of accounting practices in physical rehabilitation, a psychiatric hospital, family counseling and self-help groups for home caregivers. The program centers on narrative events and strategic storytelling in everyday life, especially in an institutional context, with attention to implications for social policy.

Along with Holstein, Gubrium is credited with introducing the concept of "the active interview" to the social science community, as well as concepts for researching storytelling and other accounts in everyday life, such as "analytic bracketing," "interpretive practice," "narrative ethnography," "narrative environments," "scenic presence," "assemblages of meaning, "narrative eventfulness," "biographical work," "deprivatization," "institutional identity," "local enactment," and "organizational embeddedness". Put together, the concepts provide a working configuration of ideas and categories—an analytics—for making visible and documenting the everyday organization of experience.

Lecturer 
Gubrium has lectured at universities around the world, including:

Canada 

 University of Toronto
 University of Manitoba
 University of Montreal
 University of Victoria
 University of Calgary
 University of Ottawa
 Carlton University
 McMaster University
 Queen's University
 University of Waterloo
 St. Thomas University
 Trent University

Japan 

 Waseda University
 Kyoto University

Sweden 

 Lund University
 Uppsala University
 University of Gothenburg
 Linköping University

United Kingdom 

 Open University
 Goldsmiths, University of London
 University of Nottingham
 University of Stirling
 University of Oxford
 Cambridge University

Denmark 

 University of Copenhagen
 Aalborg University
 Aarhus University
 Roskilde University

Finland 
 Tampere University
 University of Helsinki

Norway 
 Oslo University
 Oslo Metropolitan University

Italy 
 Bergamo University
 University of Milan

United States 

 University of California, Los Angeles 
 University of Southern California
 Syracuse University
 University of Texas
 Northwestern University
 University of Illinois
 University of Wisconsin
 University of Minnesota
 Pennsylvania State University
 Florida State University
 University of Iowa
 University of Kansas
 Colorado College
 University of South Florida

He lectured at Konstanz University in Germany; Tel-Aviv University in Israel; Bergamo University in Italy; St. Gallen's University in Switzerland; the University of Oslo and University of Agder in Norway; at the University of Helsinki and Tampere University in Finland.

Bibliography

Books 

 Living and Dying at Murray Manor (Gubrium 1997/1975)
  Time, Roles, and Self in Old Age (Gubrium 1976)
  Analyzing Field Reality (Gubrium 1988)
 Out of Control: Family Therapy and Domestic Disorder" (Gubrium 1992)
  Aging, Self, and Community (Gubrium & Charmaz 1992)
 Speaking of Life (Gubrium 1993)
 Caretakers: Treating Emotionally Disturbed Children (Buckholdt & Gubrium 1979)
 Describing Care: Image and Practice Rehabilitation (Gubrium & Buckholdt 1982)
 Oldtimers and Alzheimer's: The Descriptive Organization of Senility (Gubrium 1986)
 What is Family? (Gubrium & Holstein 1990)
  The Home Care Experience: Ethnography and Policy (Gubrium & Sankar 1990)
  The Mosaic of Care: Frail Elderly and their Families in the Real World (Gubrium 1991)
  The Active Interview (Holstein & Gubrium 1995)
 The New Language of Qualitative Method (Gubrium & Holstein 1997)
  "Constructing the Life Course" (Gubrium & Buckholdt 2000)
 The Self We Live By: Narrative Identity in a Postmodern World (Holstein & Gubrium 2000)
  Institutional Selves: Troubles Identities in a Postmodern World (Gubrium & Holstein 2001)
  Couples, Kids, and Family Life (Gubrium & Holstein 2006)
 Analyzing Narrative Reality (Gubrium & Holstein 2009)
  Varieties of Narrative Analysis (Holstein & Gubrium 2012)
 Turning Troubles into Problems: Clientization in Human Services (Gubrium 2014) 
 Reimagining the Human Service Relationship (Gubrium, Andreassen & Solvang 2016) 

Along with several collaborators, he also has published numerous related chapters and journal articles on the structure of everyday life,  aging and the life course, the Alzheimer's disease movement, the physical rehabilitation process, children with ADHD, the social organization of care, human service practice, constructions of family, qualitative methodology, ethnographic fieldwork, and narrative analysis.

Personal life 
He is married to Suzanne Kish Gubrium, who is a retired medical software developer. They have two daughters, Aline Gubrium and Erika Gubrium, and five grandchildren (Marit, Lily, Malin, Espen, and Axel). Aline Gubrium is professor of public health at the University of Massachusetts, Amherst, and Erika Gubrium is professor of social work and social policy at Oslo Metropolitan University in Norway.

References 

American sociologists
Living people
University of Missouri faculty
Writers from Columbia, Missouri
University of Florida faculty
1943 births